Robert H. Magie Jr. (May 9, 1914 – March 27, 2000) was an American curler.

Magie was an insurance agent and a scratch golfer.

Teams

References

External links
 
Robert H Magie Junior in the 1940 Census | Ancestry®

1914 births
2000 deaths
American male curlers
American curling champions